Hide Our Psychommunity is a live album by hide, released on April 23, 2008. It contains almost all of his August 10, 1994 Yokohama Arena concert (a cover of "20th Century Boy" by T.Rex is cut), from his 1994 tour of the same name. The album reached number 25 on the Oricon chart.

Track listing

References

2008 live albums
Hide (musician) albums